Beit Arif (lit. House of Cloud) is a moshav in central Israel. Located near Shoham, it falls under the jurisdiction of Hevel Modi'in Regional Council.

History
During the 18th and 19th centuries, Beit Arif was the site of the village of Dayr Tarif. It belonged to the Nahiyeh (sub-district) of Lod that encompassed the area of the present-day city of Modi'in-Maccabim-Re'ut in the south to the present-day city of El'ad in the north, and from the foothills in the east, through the Lod Valley to the outskirts of Jaffa in the west. This area was home to thousands of inhabitants in about 20 villages, who had at their disposal tens of thousands of hectares of prime agricultural land.

The moshav was founded in 1949 by immigrants from Bulgaria on the ruins of the depopulated Palestinian village of Dayr Tarif (the Romans referred to Dayr Tarif as Bethariph). It was originally named Ahlama (Exodus 28:19), after one of the twelve stones in the Hoshen, the sacred breastplate worn by a Jewish high priest. Four other nearby settlements, Bareket, Shoham, Leshem and Nofekh, are also named after such stones.

In the early 1950s some Jewish refugees from Yemen and Aden arrived in the area, and built homes about half a kilometre away. After disagreements between the two groups, the original residents left and moved to Ginaton (a moshav also founded by Bulgarian-Jewish immigrants) in 1953.

References

Moshavim
Populated places established in 1949
Populated places in Central District (Israel)
1949 establishments in Israel
Bulgarian-Jewish culture in Israel
Yemeni-Jewish culture in Israel